
Gmina Polanka Wielka is a rural gmina (administrative district) in Oświęcim County, Lesser Poland Voivodeship, in southern Poland.

Neighbouring gminas
Gmina Polanka Wielka is bordered by the gminas of Osiek, Oświęcim, Przeciszów and Wieprz.

References
Polish official population figures 2006

Polanka Wielka
Oświęcim County